A by-election was held for the seat of Bundamba in the Legislative Assembly of Queensland on 28 March 2020, the same day as the Currumbin by-election and local government elections, following the resignation of Jo-Ann Miller on 20 February 2020. Lance McCallum won the by-election, holding the seat for the Labor Party.

Key dates

Candidates

Opinion polling

Results

Notes

References

External links
Bundamba By-election – Electoral Commission Queensland
Bundamba by-election – ABC Elections
Bundamba by-election, 2020 – The Tally Room

2020 Bundamba state by-election
2020 elections in Australia